Victor Stepaniuc (born 13 July 1958) is a Moldovan historian and politician.

He has been a member of the Parliament of Moldova since 1996 until 2010. He served several times as Leader of Parliament Commission for Education, Youth, Culture and Sports (1998-2001), leader of Communist Fraction in Parliament (2001-2005) and another mandate as Leader of Parliament Commission for Education, Culture and Sports (2005-2008). In 2005, He was one of the favorites to be next Speaker of the Parliament, but because of the counselor's of the ex-president of Moldova, Vladimir Voronin - Mark Tkaciuk, Oleg Reidman and other pretenders docile to ex-president, who were afraid to the popularity of the deputy Victor Stepaniuc, decided to choose Marian Lupu on this post, a non-communist member, with economical views.

External links 
 APCE - Victor Stepaniuc
 http://chisinau.novopress.info/?p=338, Partidul Comunistilor din RM - lideri, grupari, interese
 http://www.cnaa.md/files/theses/2007/7364/victor_stepaniuc_abstract.pdf

References

1958 births
Living people
People from Ialoveni District
Communist Party of Moldavia politicians
Party of Communists of the Republic of Moldova politicians
Deputy Prime Ministers of Moldova
Moldovan MPs 2001–2005
Moldovan MPs 2009–2010
Recipients of the Order of Honour (Moldova)